Brion or Brión may refer to:

Places

France
Brion, Ain
Brion, Indre
Brion, Isère
Brion, Lozère

Brion, Saône-et-Loire
Brion, Vienne
Brion, Yonne
Brion-près-Thouet
Brion-sur-Ource
Manoir de Brion, a Benedictine priory
Hôtel Brion, an Art Nouveau hôtel particulier in Strasbourg

Elsewhere
Brion Island, Canada
Brión, a municipality in Galicia, Spain
Brión Municipality, Miranda, Venezuela

People
Brión mac Echach Muigmedóin (extant around 362), son of Eochaid Mugmedon
Brion James, American character actor, starring in Another 48 Hours
Brion Vibber, lead developer of Mediawiki software
Louis Brion de la Tour (1743–1803), French geographer
Friederike Brion, Alsatian muse of Johann Wolfgang von Goethe
Jon Brion (born 1963), American musician
 Luis Brion, Venezuelan almirant
Skip Brion, Pennsylvania politician

Fictional characters 

 Prince Brion Markov (alias Geo-Force), main character of the Young Justice comic in the third season, "Outsiders"

See also
Brione (disambiguation)
Brian (disambiguation)